The lemon-chested greenlet (Hylophilus thoracicus) is a species of bird in the family Vireonidae.
It is found in Bolivia, Brazil, Colombia, Ecuador, French Guiana, Guyana, Peru, Suriname, and Venezuela.

Its natural habitats are subtropical or tropical moist lowland forests, subtropical or tropical swamps, and heavily degraded former forest.

References

External links
Hylophilus thoracicus on BirdLife International
Hylophilus thoracicus on All Birds Barcoding Initiative
Hylophilus thoracicus on BoldSystems

lemon-chested greenlet
Birds of the Amazon Basin
Birds of the Bolivian Amazon
Birds of the Ecuadorian Amazon
Birds of the Peruvian Amazon
Birds of the Guianas
lemon-chested greenlet
Taxonomy articles created by Polbot